Elena Grölz née Leonte (born 26 July 1960 in Bacău) is a Romanian-born German retired handball player. She participated at the 1992 Summer Olympics, where the German national team placed fourth.

Honours 
 4× Romanian champion
 3× Romanian Cup winner
 3× German champion with TV Lützellinden
 2× German Cup winner with TV Lützellinden
 4× German League Top scorer in 1991, 1992, 1993 and 1995 with TV Mainzlar
 3×  German handballer of the Year in 1988, 1991 and 1992

References 
 Profile at sports-reference.com

1960 births
Living people
Sportspeople from Bacău
German female handball players
German people of Romanian descent
Romanian female handball players
Romanian emigrants to Germany
Olympic handball players of Germany
Handball players at the 1992 Summer Olympics